Janiszewski (feminine Janiszewska) is a Polish surname, it may refer to:
 Barbara Janiszewska, Polish athlete
 Henryk Janiszewski, Polish ice hockey player
 Jerzy Janiszewski, Polish artist
 Michał Janiszewski, Polish military officer
 Robert C. Janiszewski, American politician
 Zygmunt Janiszewski, Polish mathematician